Eetu Liukas (born 25 September 2002) is a Finnish professional ice hockey player who plays for HPK in Liiga. He was selected 157th overall in the 2021 NHL Entry Draft by the New York Islanders

Playing career
Liukas first played in Liiga with HC TPS during the 2019–20 season, appearing in 3 regular season games. In the following 2020–21 season, Liukas played predominately in the Liiga, posting 3 points through 19 games. He was selected in the fifth-round, 157th overall, by the New York Islanders of the 2021 NHL Entry Draft. 

In his third season with TPS in 2021–22, Liukas posted new career bests of 8 goals and 12 points in 48 regular season games. He featured in 17 playoff contests, notching 4 goals.

On 4 May 2022, Liukas opted to leave TPS, in signing a two-year contract with fellow Liiga club, HPK.

Career statistics

Regular season and playoffs

International

References

External links
 

Living people
2002 births
Finnish ice hockey right wingers
HPK players
People from Kaarina
New York Islanders draft picks
Sportspeople from Southwest Finland
HC TPS players